Falkland Islands Radio Service is an independent radio broadcaster in the Falkland Islands. The station broadcasts for 76 hours each week and provides a wide range of programming including all music genres, local news and phone-in shows.  The station has five full-time staff members, approximately 15 part-time presenters and volunteers from the community contribute to some programming.  Although officially called "Falkland Islands Radio Service" the station ident is "Falklands Radio" and it is often referred to as "FIRS".  The station's main competitors are KTV Radio Nova and KTV Radio Nova Saint FM, as well as BFBS the Forces Station.

External links
Local Broadcasting at the Base of the World
Station history
Falklands Information website
Shortwave Central blog
Falklands Radio website

Communications in the Falkland Islands
Radio stations in the Falkland Islands